The rugby sevens competition at the 2014 Central American and Caribbean Games was held in Veracruz, Mexico.

The tournament was scheduled to be held from 28–29 November at the High Performance Center in Veracruz.

Medal summary

Medal table

References

External links
Official Website

2014 Central American and Caribbean Games events
Central American and Caribbean Games events
2014